Gold is the first studio album by the Japanese singer Jasmine, released in two formats, standard and limited, on July 21, 2010 by Sony Music Associated. The limited edition (a digipak) includes a bonus DVD.

Track listing
From Natalie.mu

Singles

Charts

Release history

References

External links
 Oricon Profile: Regular // Limited
 Sony Music Profile Regular // Limited

2010 debut albums
Jasmine (Japanese singer) albums
Japanese-language albums
Sony Music albums